An incidence graph is a Levi graph. 

In graph theory, a vertex is incident with an edge if the vertex is one of the two vertices the edge connects.

 and 

An incidence coloring of a graph  is an assignment of a color to each incidence of G in such a way that adjacent incidences get distinct colors. It is equivalent to a strong edge coloring of the graph obtained by subdivising each edge of  once.

References 

|The Incidence Coloring Page, by Éric Sopena.

Graph theory objects